Hama Military Airport  is a military airport located in west of Hama, Syria.

Facilities
It has one asphalt paved runway, which measures .

During Syrian Civil War
The airbase was used extensively by the Syrian Arab Air Force during the Syrian Civil War.

On 18 May 2018, a series of massive explosions at the airbase reportedly resulted in the death of 11 people and dozens others injured or missing. According to Syrian military officials, technical failure inside the depots had caused the incident, while other sources allege it had been triggered by an Israeli airstrike or a sabotage operation by the jihadist group Saraya Al-Jihad, who claimed responsibility soon afterwards.

On 1 March 2020, Turkish drones bombed the 47th brigade which was located in the airbase.

References

See also
List of Syrian Air Force bases

Syrian Air Force bases
Military installations of Syria